The Jervis Bay tree frog (Litoria jervisiensis), also known as the curry frog in reference to its odour, is a species of Australian frog associated with wallum swampland along the east coast of New South Wales; ranging from the Queensland border to eastern Victoria.

Description
This is a moderately large species of tree frog, up to 55 mm in length. It is normally brown in dorsal colour and has a large double band on the back starting from between the eyes and down to the vent; this band may be indistinct in some specimens. It has a dark band starting at the snout and ending at the base of the arms. The armpits are coloured yellow and the thighs red-orange. The iris is golden-brown in colour. Toe discs are large and the toes are webbed.

Taxonomy
Until 1994, this species was not recognised as distinct from the heath frog, Litoria littlejohni. The heath frog is larger in size and has orange instead of yellow in the armpits.

Ecology and behaviour
This species of frog is strongly associated with coastal swamps, particularly wallum swampland. Males call in the cooler months, normally after rain. The call is a three-noted "weep-weep-weep". Breeding tends to take place in larger, permanent water bodies.

See also
 Jervis Bay

References

  Database entry includes a range map and a brief justification of why this species is of least concern
 Anstis, M. 2002. Tadpoles of South-eastern Australia. Reed New Holland: Sydney.
 Robinson, M. 2002. A Field Guide to Frogs of Australia. Australian Museum/Reed New Holland: Sydney.

External links
 
 
 Frogs Australia Network – frog call sound clip available here.
 Frogs of Australia

Litoria
Amphibians of New South Wales
Amphibians of Victoria (Australia)
Amphibians described in 1841
Taxa named by André Marie Constant Duméril
Taxa named by Gabriel Bibron
Frogs of Australia